State Air Company Berkut, commonly known as Berkut Air, was an airline based in Nur-Sultan, Kazakhstan, operated Government charter flights out of Nursultan Nazarbayev International Airport.

History
Berkut was founded in 1999. Along with all other commercial Kazakh airlines with the exception of Air Astana, it was banned from entering EU airspace in April 2009, due to the country's poor maintenance standards.

In 2011 the airline was rebranded as Bek Air.

Fleet

Current Fleet

The Berkut Air fleet consisted of the following aircraft (as of August 2019):

Former fleet
The airline previously operated the following aircraft:
1 Antonov An-12, UP-AN205, Cargo
1 Fokker 100, UP-F1004, Charter
1 Yakovlev Yak-40, UP-Y4023, Charter
1 Tupolev Tu-154M, UN-85713, Charter 
1 Boeing 747-200, 9G-MKS, Cargo

References

External links

Defunct airlines of Kazakhstan
Airlines established in 1999
Airlines disestablished in 2011
Government-owned airlines
1999 establishments in Kazakhstan